1952 Országos Bajnokság I (men's water polo) was the 46th water polo championship in Hungary. There were ten teams who played one-round match for the title.

Final list 

* M: Matches W: Win D: Drawn L: Lost G+: Goals earned G-: Goals got P: Point

2. Class 
Qualification-Relegation play-offs: 1. Vasas Izzó 11, 2. Szegedi Dózsa 10, 3. Vasas Csepel Autó 9, 4. Miskolci Bástya 6, 5. Győri Vasas 2, 6. Székesfehérvári Dózsa 2, 7. Tolnai Vörös Lobogó 2 point.

Budapest: 1. Vasas Izzó 27, 2. Csepeli Vasas 27, 3. Bp. Előre 20, 4. Vasas MÁVAG 20, 5. Vasas Beloiannisz-gyár 20, 6. III. ker. Vörös Lobogó 15, 7. Előre MÁVAUT 8, 8. Bp. Szikra 7, 9. Bp. Építők 0 point.

Sources 
Gyarmati Dezső: Aranykor (Hérodotosz Könyvkiadó és Értékesítő Bt., Budapest, 2002.)

1952 in water polo
1952 in Hungarian sport
Seasons in Hungarian water polo competitions